The Long Anzani Longster AL-1 is an early homebuilt aircraft.

Design and development
The Anzani Longster was the second in the series of nine homebuilt designs from Leslie Long. The design was published in the 1931 issue of 'Modern Mechanix and Inventions'.

The Longster is a conventional landing gear-equipped, single engine, mid-wing aircraft with lower wing struts. The rudder is balanced without a fixed vertical stabilizer.

Operational history
One replica of the Longster has been built from the original plans by students at Lane Community College for display in the Oregon Aviation Museum.

Variants
Anzani Longster
Heath Longster
A wire braced parasol modification with a Heath modified Henderson motorcycle engine.
Ultralight Longster
A modern replica of the Longster with various engine installations.

Specifications (Anzani Longster)

See also

References

Homebuilt aircraft